Lala Mountain, also known as Daguan Mountain, is a mountain in Taiwan, located at the junction of Fuxing District, Taoyuan City and Wulai District, New Taipei City, with an elevation of 2,031 meters (6,663 ft). Lala Mountain is one of Taiwan's "natural protection zones," including 500- to 2,800-year-old divine trees and the "No. 5 Divine Tree," which predates Confucius.

Etymology
The term "Lala" in the Atayal language "R'ra" originally meant "to look into the distance on tiptoe". Due to the high terrain, it was the commanding height of the early local Atayal tribe male watch tribe and monitoring enemy invasion, so the Atayal people called the local R'ra. However, according to the field investigation conducted by Ushinosuke Mori during the Japanese Occupation era, "Lala" means "sword" in Atayal, and "Lala Mountain" means "Sword Mountain".

References

External links

Lala Mountain on Taiwan Tourism Bureau

Mountains of Taiwan
Landforms of Taoyuan City
Landforms of New Taipei
Tourist attractions in Taoyuan City
Tourist attractions in New Taipei